Marián Kurty (born 13 May 1983 in Bardejov) is a former Slovak football midfielder.

Career
Talented Kurty started his professional career at BSC Bardejov. In 2001, he joined Slovak club MŠK SCP Ružomberok. After termination of the contract in Ružomberok, he moved to FK Dukla Banská Bystrica. For chronic back problems, still untied contract with FK Dukla Banská Bystrica. Persistent health problems had the effect of ending his career.

Honours

Slovakia
Slovakia U20
2003 FIFA U-20 World Cup: Participation
Slovakia U19
 2002 UEFA European Under-19 Football Championship - Third place

References

External links

1983 births
Living people
Slovak footballers
Slovakia youth international footballers
Slovakia international footballers
Association football midfielders
Partizán Bardejov players
MFK Ružomberok players
FK Dukla Banská Bystrica players
Slovak Super Liga players
People from Bardejov
Sportspeople from the Prešov Region